To Hon To (born 4 April 1989) is a former Hong Kong professional football player. His position is forward.

Club career
To is the top scorer of the reserve league in the 2007–2008 season which he scored 18 goals in 21 games.

International career
To was a member of the Hong Kong national under-23 football team for the 2012 London Olympics qualifiers. He scored two goals against Maldives on 23 February 2011 to help Hong Kong secure a 4:0 victory.

Honours

Club
Tai Po
Hong Kong Senior Shield (1): 2012–13

Kitchee
Hong Kong First Division (1): 2013–14
Hong Kong Premier League (1): 2014–15

International
Hong Kong U-23
Hong Kong–Macau Interport (2): 2008, 2009

Individual
Hong Kong Top Footballer Awards Best Youth Player (1): 2010–11

Career statistics

Club
As of 22 February 2015

International
As of 23 June 2010

References

External links
 
 To Hon Ho at HKFA

1989 births
Living people
Hong Kong footballers
Hong Kong Rangers FC players
Fourway Athletics players
Tai Po FC players
Double Flower FA players
Kitchee SC players
South China AA players
Hong Kong First Division League players
Hong Kong Premier League players
Association football midfielders